Brady Jones (born 16 September 1988) is an Australian cricketer who played for Tasmania.

Jones played 17 first class matches, but at the end of the 2011–12 season, his contract with Cricket Tasmania was not renewed. Jones subsequently joined Clarence Football Club and played in the Tasmanian Football League. He was selected for the TFL representative side to play the VFL, becoming the first person to represent Tasmania in both football and cricket in the same year. Jones also won the Lefroy Medal for being the best Tasmanian player in that match.

See also
 List of Tasmanian representative cricketers

References

1988 births
Living people
Tasmania cricketers
Clarence Football Club players
Australian cricketers
Australian rules footballers from Tasmania
Wicket-keepers